Simon Eder (born 23 February 1983) is an Austrian biathlete.

Career
His first World Cup win was in the Khanty-Mansiysk mass-start race on 29 March 2009.

Eder represented Austria at the 2010 Winter Olympics and in 2014 Winter Olympics. He won 2 medals: silver in the Men's relay in 2010, and a bronze in Men's relay in 2014. Both of the relays together with Daniel Mesotitsch, Dominik Landertinger and Christoph Sumann.

He is known for his fast shooting times, having recorded sub-20 second performances on the shooting range. He is the son of former biathlete and Austrian national biathlon coach Alfred Eder.

Biathlon results
All results are sourced from the International Biathlon Union.

Olympic Games
2 medals (1 silver, 1 bronze)
:*The mixed relay was added as an event in 2014.

World Championships
5 medals (2 silver, 3 bronze)

*During Olympic seasons competitions are only held for those events not included in the Olympic program.
**The single mixed relay was added as an event in 2019.

Junior/Youth World Championships
2 medals (1 gold, 1 bronze)

Individual victories
3 victories (2 Pu, 1 MS) 
 
*Results are from UIPMB and IBU races which include the Biathlon World Cup, Biathlon World Championships and the Winter Olympic Games.

References

External links

1983 births
Living people
People from Zell am See
Austrian male biathletes
Biathletes at the 2010 Winter Olympics
Biathletes at the 2014 Winter Olympics
Biathletes at the 2018 Winter Olympics
Biathletes at the 2022 Winter Olympics
Olympic biathletes of Austria
Medalists at the 2010 Winter Olympics
Medalists at the 2014 Winter Olympics
Olympic medalists in biathlon
Olympic bronze medalists for Austria
Olympic silver medalists for Austria
Biathlon World Championships medalists
Sportspeople from Salzburg (state)